This is a list of Chimpui episodes, a Japanese manga created by Fujiko Fujio in 1985. All episodes are 22–24 minutes long and consist of 2 segments.

Episode list

Chimpui